Group A of the 2017 Rugby League World Cup is one of the four groups in the 2017 Rugby League World Cup, which began on 27 October and was completed on 12 November 2017. The group comprised hosts Australia as well as England and France. They were joined by the winner of the Middle East-Africa qualifier, Lebanon. The group was one of two weighted groups containing top seeded teams where the top 3 qualify for the quarter finals. Australia, England and Lebanon finished the group stage in these positions.

Standings

Matches

Australia vs England

France vs Lebanon 

Notes:
Lebanon's victory over France was their first ever win at a World Cup.

Australia vs France

England vs Lebanon

Australia vs Lebanon

England vs France

References

External links
 Official RLWC 2017 Site

2017 Rugby League World Cup